Shani is a berry-flavoured soft drink produced by PepsiCo.  It is sold and marketed outside the United States. The drink is popular in the Middle East region.

References

External links
The logo

PepsiCo brands
Soft drinks